The 2016–17 season was Celje's 26th season in the Slovenian top division, Slovenian PrvaLiga, since the league was created in 1991 with Celje as one of the league's founding members. Celje competed in Slovenian PrvaLiga and Slovenian Football Cup.

Players

Source:NK Celje

Transfer

Pre-season and friendlies

Summer

Winter

Competitions

Overall

Overview
{| class="wikitable" style="text-align: center"
|-
!rowspan=2|Competition
!colspan=8|Record
|-
!
!
!
!
!
!
!
!
|-
| PrvaLiga

|-
| Cup

|-
! Total

PrvaLiga

League table

Results summary

Results by round

Matches

Cup

First round

Round of 16

Statistics

Goalscorers

Slovenian PrvaLiga
8 goals
 Dalibor Volaš

5 goals
 Lovre Čirjak

4 goals
 Irfan Hadžić

3 goals
 Matej Podlogar

2 goals
 Amar Rahmanović

1 goal
 Jure Travner
 Nino Pungaršek
 Marin Glavaš

Slovenian Football Cup
2 goals
 Matej Podlogar
 Amar Rahmanović
1 goal
 Elvedin Džinić
 Anej Lovrečič
 Marin Glavaš

See also
2016–17 Slovenian PrvaLiga
2016–17 Slovenian Football Cup

References

External links
Official website  
PrvaLiga profile 
Official UEFA profile

Slovenian football clubs 2016–17 season
2016–17